Mahwah Assembly was a Ford Motor Company manufacturing plant in Mahwah, New Jersey, 30 miles (48 km) from New York City. It occupied over 172 acres.

History
The factory began operations in 1955, and was closed in 1980. It was one of three manufacturing facilities in New Jersey. It was built two years after the Edison Assembly plant opened and would eventually replace the Ford Motor Company Edgewater Assembly Plant which closed in 1955.

Mahwah Assembly produced 6 million cars in the 25 years it operated before the last car rolled off the line on June 20, 1980. At the time of its completion, it was the largest motor vehicle assembly plant in the United States. The Ford plant, along with other businesses such as American Brake Shoe and Foundry Company, helped contribute to the economic development of the town and its reputation for low home property taxes. The Mahwah town sports teams remain named Thunderbirds in honor of the Ford plant.

A portion of the plant site was the U.S. headquarters of Sharp Corporation, but now is home to the US Headquarters of Jaguar/Land Rover and Amazing Savings building.

Products
Vehicles produced at the plant included the 1957 Ford, Edsel, Ford Fairmont, Ford Galaxie, Ford Granada, Ford LTD, Ford Thunderbird, Lincoln Versailles, Mercury Colony Park, Mercury Meteor, Mercury Monarch and the Mercury Zephyr.

Popular culture
Bruce Springsteen's 1982 song "Johnny 99" mentions the closure of the Mahwah plant in its opening line.

See also
 List of Ford factories
 Ringwood Mines landfill site

References

External links
Mahwah Museum

Ford factories
Former motor vehicle assembly plants
Mahwah, New Jersey
Motor vehicle assembly plants in New Jersey
1950 establishments in New Jersey
1980 disestablishments in New Jersey